Johann Christoph Wilhelm Ludwig Döderlein (19 December 1791 – 9 November 1863) was a German philologist.

Biography
Ludwig Döderlein was born at Jena. His father was Johann Christoph Döderlein, professor of theology at Jena. After receiving his preliminary education at Windsheim and Schulpforta (Pforta), he studied at Munich, Heidelberg, Erlangen and Berlin. He devoted his chief attention to philology under the instruction of such men as F. Thiersch, G. F. Creuzer, J. H. Voss, F. A. Wolf, August Boeckh and P. K. Buttmann.

In 1815, soon after completing his studies at Berlin, he accepted the appointment of ordinary professor of philology in the academy of Bern. In 1819 he was transferred to Erlangen, where he became second professor of philology in the university and rector of the gymnasium. In 1827 he became first professor of philology and rhetoric and director of the philological seminary.

Works
Döderlein's most elaborate work as a philologist was marred by over-subtlety, and lacked method and clearness. He is best known by his Lateinische Synonymen und Etymologien (1826-1838), and his Homerisches Glossarium (1850-1858). To the same class belong his Lateinische Wortbildung (1838), Handbuch der lateinischen Synonymik (1839), and the Handbuch der lateinischen Etymologie (1841), besides various works of a more elementary kind intended for the use of schools and gymnasia. Most of the works named have been translated into English.

To critical philology Döderlein contributed valuable editions of Tacitus (Opera, 1847; Germania, with a German translation) and Horace (Epistolae, with a German translation, 1856-1858; Satirae, 1860). His Reden und Aufsätze (Erlangen, 1843-1847) and Öffentliche Reden (1860) consist chiefly of academic addresses dealing with various subjects in pedagogy and philology.

References

External links
 
 

1791 births
1863 deaths
German philologists
People from Erlangen
Academic staff of the University of Erlangen-Nuremberg